Yockleton railway station was a station in Yockleton, Shropshire, England. The station was opened in 1862 and closed in 1960.

References

Further reading

Disused railway stations in Shropshire
Railway stations in Great Britain opened in 1862
Railway stations in Great Britain closed in 1960
Former Great Western Railway stations
Former London and North Western Railway stations